TCA may refer to:

Chemistry and biochemistry
 Toxin complex a, an insecticidal toxin complex produced by Photorhabdus luminescens bacteria
 Tricarboxylic acid cycle, an alternate name for the citric acid cycle pathway in cellular metabolism
 Trichloroacetic acid, chemical used to precipitate protein in serum
 2,4,6-Trichloroanisole, cause of cork taint in wine
 Tricyclic antidepressant, a class of medications
 TCA, a codon for the amino acid serine

Culture and media
 Taiwanese Cultural Association
 Tekeyan Armenian Cultural Association, a network of Armenian cultural organisations
 Television Critics Association
 The Canadian Amateur, radio amateur magazine
 Tribune Content Agency, a syndication company owned by Tribune Publishing
 Triple Crown of Acting is a term used in the American entertainment industry to describe actors who have won a competitive Academy Award, Emmy Award, and Tony Award in the acting categories

Economics and finance
 Transaction cost analysis
 Total cost of acquisition
 True cost accounting

Education
 The Classical Academy (Colorado), Colorado Springs, US
 Trinity Christian Academy (Deltona, Florida), US
 Trinity Christian Academy (Jackson, Tennessee), US

Organizations
 The Consulting Association
 Total Community Action
 Trans-Canada Air Lines, predecessor to Air Canada
 Train Collectors Association
 Transportes Carga Aérea, a defunct Brazilian airline

Politics
 Taiwan Constitution Association, a political party in Taiwan
 EU–UK Trade and Cooperation Agreement, between the UK and the EU (2020)
 The Competition Authority (Ireland) (2002–2014)

Other uses
 Terminal control area, a volume of controlled airspace
 Topology change acknowledgement, a message in the 802.1D Spanning Tree Protocol (STP)
 Traumatic cardiac arrest, due to trauma
 Tennant Creek Airport, IATA airport code "TCA"